Jennifer Chew (born 1983) is an American Paralympic wheelchair basketball player from Walnut Creek, California who was a silver medalist at IWBF World Championship in 2006 and won a gold one in 2010 at the same place. She also won a gold medal for her participation at the 2011 Parapan American Games and was a four-time NWWBT Champion.

References

1983 births
Living people
Paralympic wheelchair basketball players of the United States
American women's wheelchair basketball players
Sportspeople from Walnut Creek, California
Illinois Fighting Illini Paralympic athletes
Wheelchair basketball players at the 2012 Summer Paralympics
21st-century American women
20th-century American women